Prince Nikoloz Iakobis Dze Bagration-Gruzinsky (1783–1861) was a Georgian royal prince (batonishvili) of Bagrationi dynasty.

He was the son of Iakob Gruzinsky. In 1812–1823, he served as Valet de chambre.

Prince Iakob had 4 children:
Aleksandra Gruzinsky (died 1888)
Constantine Gruzinsky (died 1884)
Ivane Gruzinsky (1831–1898)
Pyotr Gruzinsky (1840–1892)

He was buried at Vagankovo Cemetery in Moscow.

References

1783 births
1861 deaths
House of Mukhrani
Georgian princes
Burials at Vagankovo Cemetery